Leonard Steckel (18 January 1901 – 9 February 1971) was a German-Jewish actor and director of stage and screen.

Steckel was born as Leonhard Steckel in Knihinin, a Galician town that is today a district of the city Ivano-Frankivsk, Ukraine. He began his career as a stage actor and spent the duration of World War II in exile in Zürich, Switzerland, where he had gone to work at the Schauspielhaus Zürich. It was during this time that he began to direct. Steckel was killed in a major rail accident on 9 February 1971 in Aitrang, Germany.

Partial filmography

 Phantoms of Happiness (1930) - Gefängnisarzt
 M (1931) - Man (uncredited)
 The Adventurer of Tunis (1931) - Ferrero
 The Daredevil (1931) - Barini, Inhaber American Hippodrom
 The Captain from Köpenick (1931) - Krakauer, ein Trödler
 Secret Agent (1932) - Oberst Salit
 The Company's in Love (1932) - Harry Bing - Regisseur
 Gitta Discovers Her Heart (1932) - Der Primas
 Nights in Port Said (1932) - Le levantin
 I Do Not Want to Know Who You Are (1932) - Alvarez Zambesi
 Mieter Schulze gegen alle (1932)
 Spione im Savoy-Hotel (1932) - Almassy, Antiquitätenhändler
 Kampf um Blond (1933) - Der Levantiner
 The House of Dora Green (1933) - Sucharow
 A Song for You (1933) - Opern-Regisseur
 Hände aus dem Dunkel (1933) - Fed Harras, Propagandachef
 Invisible Opponent (1933) - Santos
 Palace Hotel (1952) - Minor Role (uncredited)
 Southern Nights (1953) - Giuseppe
 Meines Vaters Pferde (1954, part 1, 2) - Schlachtauer
 The Seven Dresses of Katrin (1954) - Mödel, Theater-Direktor
 Viktoria und ihr Husar (1954)
 The Last Summer (1954) - Kommissar Berki
 Spring Song (1954) - Dr. Falconi
 The Eternal Waltz (1954) - Baron Carlo Todesco
 Beloved Enemy (1955) - Oberst Junot (uncredited)
 Love Without Illusions (1955) - Professor Dürkheim
 Du mein stilles Tal (1955) - Doktor
 Ballerina (1956) - Opernintendant
 The Captain from Köpenick (1956) - Adolph Wormser
 Without You All Is Darkness (1956) - Dr. Bräuner
 Stresemann (1957) - Aristide Briand
 Escape from Sahara (1958) - Ben Achmed
 The Doctor of Stalingrad (1958) - Major Dr. Kresin, Distriktarzt
 The Green Devils of Monte Cassino (1958) - Erzabt
 Majestät auf Abwegen (1958) - Filmregisseur
 Romarei, das Mädchen mit den grünen Augen (1958) - Sir Boris Olinzoff
 For Love and Others (1959) - Ihr Vater
 Ja, so ein Mädchen mit sechzehn (1959) - Arzt
 Marili (1959) - Ludwig Ostertag
 Sweetheart of the Gods (1960) - Furst
 Das Geheimnis der schwarzen Koffer (1962) - Dr. Daniel Bransby, Arzt
 The Phone Rings Every Night (1962) - Th. Th. Th. Meyer
 Whiskey and Sofa (1963) - Dehn
 The Visit (1964) - Minister
 Once a Greek (1966) - Maire Dutour

References

External links
Biography with photo 

1901 births
1971 deaths
Jewish emigrants from Nazi Germany to Switzerland
Jewish German male actors
German male stage actors
Actors from Ivano-Frankivsk
German theatre directors
German film directors
Railway accident deaths in Germany
German male film actors
German male television actors
20th-century German male actors